Philip Edward Tovrea Jr. (December 31, 1920 – January 18, 1981) was a U.S. Army Air Forces World War II flying ace who was awarded the Silver Star Medal for gallantry and the Distinguished Flying Cross for extraordinary achievement while participating in aerial flight while serving as a P-38 Fighter Pilot of the 27th Fighter Squadron. He is credited with shooting down 8 enemy aircraft in aerial combat.

Early years
Tovrea was born in Phoenix, Arizona to Philip Edward Tovrea Sr. and Helen Green Tovrea. His family was involved in the family cattle business in Arizona. His uncle Edward A. Tovrea, known as a Cattle Baron, established the Tovrea Packing Company in 1919, the base from which the Tovrea family made its fortune. Tovrea received his primary and secondary education in his native homeland.

World War II

Tovrea joined the U.S. Army Air Force the outbreak of World War II. In 1944, he was assigned to the 27th Fighter Squadron, 1st Fighter Group, 15th Air Force in Europe. His unit participated in aerial combat in the Mediterranean Theater of Operations during the war. He was awarded the Silver Star Medal for gallantry and the Distinguished Flying Cross for extraordinary achievement while participating in aerial flight. During the war Tovrea flew a Lockheed P-38 Lightning, a World War II American fighter aircraft built by Lockheed. As an Ace he was ranked 65th and credited with shooting down 8 enemy aircraft in aerial combat.

Silver Star citation

Distinguished Flying Cross citation

Tables
American Aces

Lockheed Lightning Aircraft

Later years

Tovrea served in the Board of Directors of the Tovrea Company, a family business, which was later incorporated as Arizona Packing Company. The principal business of the Tovrea Company was operating a packinghouse and buying and selling cattle. He resigned as director on November 28, 1958. He was also a partial owner of the Tovrea Equipment Company, later known as Tovrea Motors. The company sold motor fuel and vehicles to the Tovrea Company.

Tovrea married Phoebe Milicent Hearst (1927–2012), who was a granddaughter of publishing tycoon William Randolph Hearst. 

Tovrea died in 1981, at the age of 60 in Phoenix. He was buried with full Military Honors in Phoenix's Greenwood/Memory Lawn Mortuary & Cemetery.

References

1920 births
1982 deaths
Aviators from Arizona
Recipients of the Distinguished Flying Cross (United States)
United States Army Air Forces personnel of World War II